In The Song of Roland, Baligant is the Emir of Babylon (i.e., Cairo, not the Mesopotamian Babylon), who tries to aid the defense of Zaragoza (sometimes spelled "Saragossa") from Charlemagne. He is sometimes described as a man from ancient times. He is killed in the ensuing battle. He comes to the aid of his vassal King Marsile (a.k.a. "Marsillion") and brings an immense army to fight Charlemagne.  He is often seen as the parallel of Charlemagne, both being old, handsome and  skillful with a sword.  One might say they were equals, except that Charlemagne had the help of Saint Gabriel. The name Baligant is likely a folk-etymological rendering of Arabic or Turkish antroponymy.

Baligant's banner is a dragon, and he also rides into battle with the banners of Tervagant and Apollo. These standards are guarded, it seems, by ten men of Canileu. In the midst of the battle, he cries out to these deities to succour him against Charles.

Baligant and Charles meet together on the field as the day of battle turns to evening. They unhorse one another and rise with drawn swords to battle again, each sending blow after mighty blow upon the other's shield. In the midst of their combat each advises the other to repent; Baligant requests Charles' servitude, while Charles tries to convert the admiral to Christianity. Baligant then deals him a blow to the helm, leaving Charles' very skull exposed. Charles, however, hears the voice of St. Gabriel and finds the strength to strike back, dealing Baligant a deathblow to the helm. 

It has been suggested that the tale of the battle between Baligant and Charlemagne was inspired by tales of returning Norman mercenaries about the battle of Manzikert, reflecting the new danger arising in the East.

He carried a sword named Précieuse.

References

External links
 Short note about Baligant
 

Characters in The Song of Roland
Emirs
Male characters in literature
Legendary Arab people
Fictional Muslims